Nipponaspis is a genus of proetid trilobite belonging to the  family Phillipsiidae.  Fossils of the various species are found in Middle Permian-aged marine strata of Fukushima Prefecture, Japan, China, Korea, and Alaska.

References

 Proetida fact sheet   

Permian trilobites
Fossils of Japan
Fossils of China
Paleozoic life of Nunavut
Philipsidae
Proetida genera